Dean K. Thompson (born August 30, 2001) is an American professional stock car racing driver. He competes full-time in the NASCAR Craftsman Truck Series, driving the No. 5 Toyota Tundra for TRICON Garage and part-time in the ARCA Menards Series, driving the No. 15 Toyota Camry for Venturini Motorsports. He has previously competed in the ARCA Menards Series West.

Racing career

Thompson began racing at the age of 5, racing quarter midgets at Orange Show Speedway. After taking a break from racing, he returned in 2018 to race late models at the age of 16. In 2019, he ran full-time in late models and got a win at Irwindale Speedway. In 2020 and 2021, he won the Irwindale Speedway LKQ Pick Your Part Late Model Championship with 6 wins and 14 top 5 finishes in 2020, and one win and 13 top fives in 2021. He also won rookie of the year in the Spears SRL Southwest Tour Series.

In 2021, Thompson moved up to the ARCA Menards Series West, driving full-time for High Point Racing, the team he drove for in the Spears Southwest Tour in 2020. HPR also formed an alliance with Sunrise Ford Racing to help their team as it was their first time fielding a car in the West Series. Thompson's best finish was 2nd at Irwindale Speedway, winning the pole and leading most of the race, only to get passed after a late restart. He finished the year with two poles, one top 5, and two top 10 finishes.

On October 18, 2021, it was announced that Thompson would be driving for Niece Motorsports in the season-finale for the main ARCA Menards Series at Kansas Speedway as well as the NASCAR Camping World Truck Series season-finale at Phoenix Raceway. On November 2, Niece announced that Thompson would drive full-time for the team in the Truck Series in 2022. Although the team did not announce his number in that announcement, it was expected that he would continue to drive the No. 44, but with Kris Wright having been announced to drive the No. 44 full-time in 2022, Thompson would drive the No. 40 truck, replacing Ryan Truex. On December 5, 2022, TRICON Garage announced that Thompson will drive their No. 5 truck full-time in the 2023 season.

Motorsports career results

NASCAR
(key) (Bold – Pole position awarded by qualifying time. Italics – Pole position earned by points standings or practice time. * – Most laps led.)

Craftsman Truck Series

 Season still in progress
 Ineligible for series points

ARCA Menards Series
(key) (Bold – Pole position awarded by qualifying time. Italics – Pole position earned by points standings or practice time. * – Most laps led.)

ARCA Menards Series West

References

External links
 

Living people
2001 births
People from Anaheim, California
NASCAR drivers
ARCA Menards Series drivers
Racing drivers from California